Swamp fever may refer to:

Medicine
 Equine infectious anemia, a disease
 Leptospirosis, a disease
 Malaria, a disease
 Mumps, a disease

Video games
 Swamp fever, a disease in The Elder Scrolls series of role-playing video games
 Swamp Fever, a campaign in the 2009 video game Left 4 Dead 2
 Swamp Fever, a disease in the 2015 video game Ark: Survival Evolved